is a Japanese whisky distillery. Founded in 2004 by Ichiro Akuto, and operational from 2008, it was the first new Japanese distillery since 1973.

References

Notes

Bibliography

Distilleries in Japan
Japanese whisky
Companies based in Saitama Prefecture
2004 establishments in Japan
Japanese brands